Kirilł Drogalin is an eight times Russian ice speedway world champion.  

Drogalin won the Individual Ice Speedway World Championship title in 1997, 2000 and 2001 and the Team Ice Racing World Championship titles with Russia in 1997, 1998, 1999, 2000 and 2001.

References

1963 births
Living people
Russian speedway riders
Ice Speedway World Champions
Sportspeople from Moscow